Finn Mittet (24 September 1933 – 21 August 2004) was a Danish footballer. He played in two matches for the Denmark national football team in 1955.

References

External links
 

1922 births
2004 deaths
Danish men's footballers
Denmark international footballers
Place of birth missing
Association footballers not categorized by position